The Jacksonville Cyclones were a professional soccer team based in Jacksonville, Florida. They played in the A-League from 1997 to 1999. The team originated as the Tampa Bay Cyclones, who played in Tampa, Florida from 1995 to 1996 before moving to Jacksonville. The team folded in 1999 shortly after the death of their manager Dennis Viollet, the former Manchester United and England striker.

Year-by-year

References

1995 establishments in Florida
1999 disestablishments in Florida
A-League (1995–2004) teams
Association football clubs disestablished in 1999
Association football clubs established in 1995
Sports teams in Jacksonville, Florida
Defunct soccer clubs in Florida
Soccer clubs in Florida
USISL teams